Aasgaard is a surname. Notable people with the surname include:

Johan Arnd Aasgaard (1876–1966), American Lutheran church leader
Thelo Aasgaard (born 2002), Norwegian footballer
Torleif Aasgaard (1888–1953), Norwegian businessperson

See also
Asgard, Norse Mythology
Aasgaard Company

Norwegian-language surnames